San Salvador de Jujuy, commonly known as Jujuy and locally often referred to as San Salvador, is the capital and largest city of Jujuy Province in northwest Argentina. Also, it is the seat of the Doctor Manuel Belgrano Department. It lies near the southern end of the Humahuaca Canyon where wooded hills meet the lowlands.

If its suburbs are included, this figure rises to around 300,000. The current mayor is Raúl Jorge.

City information 
Tourist destinations not far from the city are Tilcara , Humahuaca , and the Calilegua National Park .

Jujuy is located near the Andes, at the junction of the Xibi Xibi River and the Río Grande de Jujuy, 1,238 meters above sea level. The weather is humid during the summer and dry and cold during the winter. Temperatures vary widely between day and night. 
 
The city is the provincial government, financial and cultural centre.

The city has a colonial city centre including the Cabildo, the cathedral, and colorful Andean carnivals.

History 

After previous attempts in 1565 and 1592, the current city was founded as San Salvador de Velazco en el Valle de Jujuy on April 19, 1593, by Francisco de Argañarás y Murguía. The settlement initially developed as a strategic site on the mule trade route between San Miguel de Tucumán and the silver mines in Potosí, Bolivia.

Reaching its peak importance during the colonial period, San Salvador de Jujuy declined to the status of a remote provincial capital after the Argentine Declaration of Independence in 1816. The town became the capital of Jujuy Province when the latter separated from Salta Province in 1834. The 1863 Jujuy earthquake leveled the town, and it recovered slowly in the following decades. Jujuy began to grow following the arrival of the Northern Central Railway in 1900. Its first institution of higher learning, the Economic Sciences Institute, was established in 1959, and was incorporated into the new National University of Jujuy in 1973. The city was the location of a number of Argentine films, including Veronico Cruz (1988) and Una estrella y dos cafés (2005). The city's impoverished Lower Azopardo neighborhood would later give rise to Milagro Sala's Indigenist Tupac Amaru Neighborhood Association.

Climate 
Jujuy has a humid subtropical climate (Cwa, according to the Köppen climate classification), mainly because of the altitude. During heat waves, temperatures can sometimes reach  but these are not frequent and nights always bring significant cooling, as opposed to many low-lying areas in Northern Argentina.

Notable people
 

Ana Pelegrín (1938–2008), researcher, writer, and educator

See also

 List of twin towns and sister cities in Argentina
Yolanda Carenzo (pianist born in San Salvador de Jujuy)

References

External links 

  Municipal site
  City tourist and Cultural office
  Digital Newspaper

Capitals of Argentine provinces
Cities in Argentina
Populated places established in 1593
Populated places in Jujuy Province
Argentina
Jujuy Province